Atlit naval base is a classified Israeli Navy base on the northern Mediterranean coast of Israel. The base is home to Shayetet 13, Israel's naval commando unit. Within its grounds stands Château Pèlerin, a medieval crusader fortress currently closed to the public.

In 2010, Israeli prime minister Benyamin Netanyahu visited the base to salute the commandos who took part in the Gaza flotilla raid.

See also
Atlit
Atlit detainee camp

References 

Military installations of Israel
Israeli Navy
Naval installations
 Crusader castles
 Archaeology of Israel